Primitive Modern is an album by saxophonist and composer Gil Mellé recorded in 1956 and released on the Prestige label.

Reception

Allmusic awarded the album 2 stars.

Track listing 
All compositions by Gil Mellé
 "Dominica" – 5:53  
 "Iron Works" – 3:55  
 "Ballet Time" – 6:44  
 "Adventure Swing" – 5:59  
 "Dedicatory Piece to the Geo-Physical Year of 1957" – 4:41  
 "Mark One" – 4:47

Personnel 
Gil Mellé – baritone saxophone, alto saxophone 
Joe Cinderella – guitar
Billy Phipps – bass
Ed Thigpen – drums

Production
Bob Weinstock – supervisor
Rudy Van Gelder – engineer

References 

Gil Mellé albums
1956 albums
Prestige Records albums
Albums produced by Bob Weinstock
Albums recorded at Van Gelder Studio